The canton of La Grand-Croix is a French former administrative division located in the department of Loire and the Rhone-Alpes region. It was disbanded following the French canton reorganisation which came into effect in March 2015. It had 24,646 inhabitants (2012).

The canton comprised the following communes:

Cellieu
Chagnon
Doizieux
Farnay
La Grand-Croix
L'Horme
Lorette
Saint-Paul-en-Jarez
La Terrasse-sur-Dorlay
Valfleury

See also
Cantons of the Loire department

References

Grand-Croix
2015 disestablishments in France
States and territories disestablished in 2015